Martin Ssempa (born 1968) is a Ugandan pastor, activist, and the founder of the Makerere Community Church. He referred to himself as Pastor Doctor Martin Ssempa, but now calls himself Gabriel Baaba Gwanga'mujje Eri Yesu. Ssempa first came to international prominence in 2010 after a presentation video he made at his church, which showcased his opposition to homosexuality, went viral.

Early life and education
Martin Ssempa was born in Naluzaale of Uganda's Masaka District in 1968 to a single mother. He did not know his father. His mother was a teacher and he changed schools often as a child. Ssempa went to Kimanya Primary School in Masaka and St. Peter's Primary School in Nsambya. He then went to Rubaga Boys' Secondary School, before he completed his A level at Namilyango College. During his teenage years he became a celebrity in East Africa as the national break dancing champion. In 1988, Ssempa was admitted to Makerere University.

During his time at the University, both Ssempa's brother and sister contracted HIV. Ssempa sat by their beds as they grew sicker. When they died in 1990, he blamed their promiscuity and feared that his lifestyle would also lead to his death via AIDS; thus, he decided to take action. Ssempa converted to Evangelical Christianity at the Wandegeya Baptist Youth Center. He travelled the country with a drama group that performed in schools in an effort to educate students about AIDS.

Ssempa graduated from Makerere with a Bachelor's degree in Social Science, specialising in sociology. He later received a Master of Arts degree in counselling from Cairn University.

Citizenship
According to a voter registration application submitted on 6 July 2012, Ssempa is a United States citizen.

Career

Activism
Ssempa opposes the separation of church and state and the use of condoms to prevent HIV contraction, and supports abstinence plus fidelity education in the fight against sexual diseases. Ssempa claims to be leading a crusade to "kick sodomy out of Uganda, endorsing proposed legislation in Uganda that makes certain homosexual acts punishable by life in prison or, in some severe cases of rape, death".

Ssempa has advocated a cessation of tribal rivalries and hatred in Uganda. He is a strong advocate of the Uganda Anti-Homosexuality Bill. Ssempa champions the bill by showing gay pornography, depicting fisting, anilingus, and coprophilia in his church and at conferences, publicised and circulated on the internet as "Eat Da Poo Poo". Former US President Barack Obama referred to the bill as "odious".

Of the bill, Ssempa has stated the following: Some people have asked about the rationale of a death penalty mentioned in the Bill. There has been a lot of misinformation about this matter with headlines such as: “Gays face death penalty in Uganda”. These headlines are deliberately misleading. This penalty applies only in special cases termed 'aggravated homosexuality', which include, those convicted of unlawful homosexual rape of a child or handicapped invalid; this is a conviction of paedophilles!

As highlighted in the problem of 'virgin rape cures HIV/AIDS'  the offender can be a person living with HIV; a parent or guardian of the victim where there is abuse of authority! Finally is the use of drugs to stupefy the child so that they can rape them! Clearly, the intent of this penalty is to protect weaker members of society from being victimized. Please note that for over 15 years Uganda has had the same penalty for persons who have carnal knowledge of minors heterosexually, mainly to protect against sexual abuse of girls by men. This time, this provision intends to provide equal protection of boys, among others.

Influence
Ssempa's international influence has been exhibited through his work with a branch of the U.S. Agency for International Development, the President's Emergency Plan for AIDS Relief (PEPFAR).  Because of his involvement in light of the anti-gay bill he backs in his own country, PEPFAR has been labelled by gay and lesbian support groups as promoting homophobia.

In addition to his anti-gay agenda, Ssempa has co-authored Uganda's 2004 "Abstinence and Being Faithful" AIDS policy; this policy is a revision of the previous "ABC Program" – Abstinence, Being Faithful, and Condom Usage.  As well, he is a special representative of the Task Force on AIDS of Ugandan First Lady Janet Museveni. Ssempa has testified before the United States Congress on the HIV/AIDS epidemic in Africa.

In the past, Ssempa was associated with Rick Warren and Saddleback Church's HIV/AIDS Initiative. During this time period, he served as keynote speaker at Warren's Disturbing Voices AIDS conference; Warren has since distanced himself from Ssempa and completely severed ties with him in 2007.

Arrest and conviction
In October 2012, Ssempa and five other individuals were convicted in Buganda Road Court of conspiring to tarnish a rival pastor's reputation by falsely accusing him of engaging in homosexuality. The guilty verdict stemmed from a May 2009 incident in which Ssempa and the others engaged in a conspiracy to coerce church members at Robert Kayanja's Rubaga Miracle Center Cathedral to claim that they had sexual relations with Kayanja. The six individuals, including Ssempa, were sentenced to a fine of one million shillings each (about US$390) and one hundred hours of community service.

See also
LGBT rights in Africa
LGBT rights in Uganda

Notes

References

External links
Eat da poo poo
Martin Ssempa on homosexuality debate on Ugandan NBS TV
Ssempa's "Million Voter's" March
Martin Ssempa on BBC News

1968 births
Living people
Ugandan activists
Ugandan clergy
Internet memes
Viral videos
American people of Ugandan descent
People from Masaka District
Ugandan evangelicals
Converts to evangelical Christianity
Makerere University alumni
Cairn University alumni